This is a list of Mexican films released in 2004.

2004

External links

List of 2004 box office number-one films in Mexico

References

2004
Films
Mexican